George Kenneth Griffey Jr. (born November 21, 1969), nicknamed "Junior" and "the Kid", is an American former professional baseball outfielder who played 22 years in Major League Baseball (MLB). He spent most of his career with the Seattle Mariners and Cincinnati Reds, along with a short stint with the Chicago White Sox. A member of the Baseball Hall of Fame and a thirteen-time All-Star, Griffey is one of the most prolific home run hitters in baseball history; his 630 home runs rank as the seventh-most in MLB history. Griffey was also an exceptional defender and won ten Gold Glove Awards in center field. He is tied for the record of most consecutive games with a home run (eight, with Don Mattingly and Dale Long).

Griffey signed lucrative deals with companies of international prominence like Nike and Nintendo; his popularity reflected well upon MLB and is credited by some with helping restore its image after the 1994 labor dispute. Griffey is one of only 31 players in baseball history to date to have appeared in major league games in four different calendar decades.

Following his playing career, Griffey joined the Mariners' front office as a special consultant. He was inducted into both the Mariners' Hall of Fame and the Reds Hall of Fame. In 2016, Griffey was elected to the Baseball Hall of Fame, receiving 99.32% of the vote, breaking pitcher Tom Seaver's record of 98.84%, a record that had stood for 24 years.

Griffey is the son of former MLB player Ken Griffey Sr. and the father of former football player Trey Griffey.

Early life
Griffey was born in Donora, Pennsylvania, on November 21, 1969. His family moved to Cincinnati, Ohio, where his father, Ken Griffey Sr., played for the Cincinnati Reds, when Ken Jr. was three years old. Ken Jr. was in the clubhouse during his father's back-to-back championships in the 1975 and 1976 World Series. When Griffey was a young child, Ken Sr. would instill in him the pride of a team accomplishment rather than the individual performance: "My dad would have bopped me on the head when I was a kid if I came home bragging about what I did on the field. He only wanted to know what the team did." 

He attended Archbishop Moeller High School in Cincinnati (the same high school as his future teammate Barry Larkin), where he was the U.S high school baseball player of the year in 1987. Griffey hit .478 with 17 home runs in his two seasons of high school baseball. Griffey also played football as a wide receiver and received scholarship offers to play college football for such programs as Oklahoma and Michigan.

Professional career

Draft and minor leagues
Griffey was the number one overall selection by the Seattle Mariners during the 1987 Major League Baseball draft held on June 2, 1987. He received a signing bonus of $160,000 from the Mariners. On June 11, 1987, Griffey joined the Bellingham Mariners of the Northwest League, a Class A Short Season minor league. He made his professional debut on June 16, 1987. During the 54-game season he hit .313 with 14 home runs, 40 runs batted in, and 13 steals. Baseball America magazine named him the league's number one major league prospect.

In 1988, Griffey joined the San Bernardino Spirit of the Class A-Advanced California League. During his 58 games with the Spirit, Griffey batted .338, hit 11 home runs, drove in 42 runs, and stole 32 bases. Late in the season, Griffey was promoted to the Vermont Mariners of the Class AA Eastern League. He played the final 17 games with the club, hitting .279 with two home runs and 10 runs batted in.

Seattle Mariners (1989–1999)

In his first 11 seasons with Seattle (1989–1999), Griffey established himself as one of the most prolific and exciting players of the era, racking up 1,752 hits, 398 home runs, 1,152 runs batted in, and 167 stolen bases. He led the American League in home runs for four seasons (1994, 1997, 1998, and 1999), was voted the A.L. MVP in 1997, and maintained a .297 career batting average. In his first major league at-bat, he doubled.

Griffey's defense in center field was widely considered the standard of elite fielding during the decade, exemplified by his streak of 10 straight Gold Gloves from 1990–1999. His impressive range allowed frequent spectacular diving plays, and he often dazzled fans with over-the-shoulder basket catches and robbed opposing hitters of home runs by leaping up and pulling them back into the field of play. He was featured on the Wheaties cereal box and had his own signature sneaker line from Nike, Inc.

On April 3, 1989, in his very first MLB plate appearance, Griffey hit a line-drive double off Oakland Athletics pitcher Dave Stewart at the Oakland Coliseum. One week later in his first at-bat at the Kingdome, Griffey hit his first major league home run. Griffey was a frequent participant in the All-Star Game during the 1990s. He led his league multiple times in different hitting categories.

In 1990 and 1991, Griffey and his father became the first son and father to play on the same team at the same time. In his father's first game as a Mariner, on August 31, 1990, the pair hit back-to-back singles in the first inning and both scored. On September 14, the pair hit back-to-back home runs in the top of the first off California Angels pitcher Kirk McCaskill, becoming the first father-son duo to hit back-to-back home runs. The duo played a total of 51 games together before Griffey Sr. retired in June 1991.

At the MLB Home Run Derby in 1993, which was held at Oriole Park in Baltimore, Griffey hit the warehouse beyond the right-field wall on the fly and he is still the only player ever to do so. As with every home run that hits Eutaw Street, each feat is honored with a circular plaque, embedded horizontally onto the concourse's walkway, in the exact spot where the ball landed. In 1994, he led the league in voting for All-Star Game selection. That season, which ended prematurely on August 12 due to the labor dispute, saw Griffey hit 30 home runs in the Mariners' first 65 games. He would go on to have four multi-home run games that year. While his pace cooled somewhat in the final eight weeks of the season (he only hit 10 home runs in the Mariners' last 47 games), his 40 home runs by August 12 still put him two ahead of Chicago's Frank Thomas and four ahead of Cleveland's Albert Belle for the AL lead.

One of the most memorable moments of Griffey's career with the Mariners came during the 1995 American League Division Series (ALDS) against the New York Yankees. After losing the first two games, the Mariners and Griffey were on the verge of elimination, but came back to win the next two games, setting up a decisive fifth game. In the bottom of the 11th inning of Game 5, with Griffey on first base, teammate Edgar Martínez hit a double. Griffey raced around the bases, slid into home with the winning run, and popped up into the waiting arms of the entire team. The 1995 AL Division Series would kick off a brief rivalry between the Yankees and Mariners. Griffey may have escalated it by saying that he would never play for the Yankees, because the Yankees allegedly treated his father, Ken Griffey Sr. badly. Also, when Griffey was a kid visiting his dad in the Yankee clubhouse, Yankee manager Billy Martin would, believing that children did not belong in the clubhouse, kick him out of there. Although the Mariners subsequently lost the ALCS to the Cleveland Indians (managed by later Mariners manager Mike Hargrove), that moment remains one of the most memorable in Mariners history, capping a season that "saved baseball in Seattle", Seattle's improbable late-season playoff run that year, spurred by the return of Griffey from injury, led to the construction of Safeco Field and the future security of a franchise rumored for years to be on the move. The play also inspired the title of the video game Ken Griffey Jr.'s Winning Run for the Super NES.

In 1997, Griffey led the Mariners to the AL West crown and captured the American League Most Valuable Player Award, hitting .304 with 56 home runs and 147 runs batted in during 157 games. The next season, 1998, was a season which was followed closely by the national media as both Griffey and Mark McGwire entered the summer ahead of the pace of Roger Maris' home run record of 61. Despite Griffey falling short, Major League Baseball put forth an effort to draw a new set of young fans and regain those disenchanted by the 1994 strike focused on McGwire, Sosa, and Griffey's pursuit of Maris' record. Griffey, however, fell out of the spotlight due to some nagging injuries and was surpassed by Chicago Cubs slugger Sammy Sosa, who finished with 66 home runs, himself falling short of McGwire's then record 70. Despite falling out of the record chase, Griffey nearly duplicated his 1997 statistics, finishing with a .284 average, 56 home runs and 146 runs batted in during 161 games. On April 15, 1997, Griffey wore the number 42, which led to an MLB tradition started in 1999 known as Jackie Robinson Day.

In 1999, he ranked 93rd on The Sporting News''' list of the 100 Greatest Baseball Players. This list was compiled during the 1998 season, counting only statistics through 1997. At age 29 (going on 30), he was the youngest player on the list. That same year, Griffey was elected to the Major League Baseball All-Century Team. However, when TSN updated their list for a new book in 2005, despite having surpassed 400 and 500 home runs, Griffey remained at Number 93.

While playing with Seattle, Griffey was a 10-time American League Gold Glove winner, the 1992 All-Star Game MVP, 1997 AL MVP, 1998 ESPY co-winner for Male Athlete of the Year, 1999 Players Choice Awards Player of the Decade (by the players), and was named to the All-Century team in 1999.

Departure from Seattle (1999–2000)
Griffey formerly lived in the same neighborhood in Orlando as golfer Payne Stewart. After Stewart's death in a plane crash on October 25, 1999, Griffey started expressing a desire to live closer to his relatives in his hometown of Cincinnati. Not only did Griffey want to live closer, but he wanted to be able to raise his kids, Trey and Taryn (Tevin was not born at the time). On February 10, 2000, Griffey was traded to the Reds for pitcher Brett Tomko, outfielder Mike Cameron, and minor leaguers Antonio Perez and Jake Meyer. Griffey signed a nine-year, $112.5 million contract with the Reds after the trade was completed, with a club option for a tenth. Earlier that offseason, Griffey had vetoed a trade to the New York Mets for Roger Cedeño, Octavio Dotel and a relief pitcher variously reported as Dennis Cook or Armando Benítez. Griffey's agent, Brian Goldberg, said afterward that Griffey would only accept a trade to the Reds and, "[i]f he can't go to Cincinnati, then he's going back to Seattle for the final year of his contract."

Cincinnati Reds (2000–2008)
2000–2004

In 2000, Griffey also changed his number from 24 to 30, the number his father wore while playing in both Cincinnati and Seattle; the number 24 was already retired in honor of Tony Pérez. The 2000 season began what has generally been seen by the media as a decline in Griffey's superstar status. Although his statistics during this season were respectable, they were far below his previous level of play: in 145 games, Griffey hit .271 with 40 home runs and 118 runs batted in, but his .942 on-base plus slugging was his lowest mark in five years. Additionally, from 2001 through 2004, Griffey was plagued by a string of injuries, including season-ending injuries in 2002, 2003, and 2004. Worse yet for Griffey, the cumulative effects of the injuries lowered his bat speed, resulting in less power and fewer home runs (he slugged only .426 before succumbing to injury in 2002, his lowest output in seven years). Injuries forced Griffey to miss 260 out of 486 games from 2002 through 2004, diminishing both his skills and his star reputation.

In 2004, Griffey avoided major injury during the first half of the season, and on June 20 became the 20th player to hit 500 career home runs. His 500th home run came on Father's Day in a game against the St. Louis Cardinals at Busch Stadium, with his father in the stands; the homer tied Griffey with his father in career hits with 2,143. However, the injury bug bit again just before the All-Star break; he suffered a partial hamstring tear, knocking him out of the All-Star Game and putting him on the disabled list yet again.

Griffey finished the 2004 season on the disabled list after suffering a rupture of his right hamstring in San Francisco. The play in question occurred at AT&T Park in a game against the San Francisco Giants. Griffey was starting in right field for the first time in his 16-year Major League career when he raced toward the gap to try to cut off a ball before it got to the wall. He slid as he got to the ball, but in the process hyper-extended his right leg, tearing the hamstring completely off the bone. He later came out of the game, complaining of "tightness" in the hamstring exacerbated by chilly conditions in San Francisco. However, there was far more to it than anyone realized at the time.

Shortly after this injury, the Reds' team physician, Timothy Kremchek, devised an experimental surgery dubbed "The Junior Operation" that would use three titanium screws to reattach Griffey's hamstring. For several weeks, Griffey's right leg was in a sling that kept it at a 90-degree angle, and he was not able to move the leg until late October. After an intense rehabilitation period, he returned for the 2005 season. In April, he hit .244 with one homer (on April 30) and 9 runs batted in.

2005–2006

Starting May 1, the 2005 season saw the resurgence of a healthy Griffey. His 35 home runs were his highest since his first year with the Reds as Griffey slowly moved up the career home run list. He ended the season tied with Mickey Mantle, after having passed Jimmie Foxx, Ted Williams, Willie McCovey, Ernie Banks, Eddie Mathews, Mel Ott, and Eddie Murray.

Early in September, he strained a tendon in his left foot (an injury unrelated to his past hamstring and calf problems), and was listed as day-to-day for several weeks. On September 22, with the Reds out of playoff contention, Griffey decided to sit out for the rest of the season so he could immediately have arthroscopic surgery on his left knee and a separate operation to repair scars from his 2004 hamstring operation. Still, his 128 games in 2005 were the most he had played since 2000. Griffey's resurgence was recognized when he was named National League Comeback Player of the Year. He played in the World Baseball Classic for the American team that off-season with his father as a coach. Griffey batted .524, but the USA failed to reach the semifinals.

During the second game of the 2006 regular season, Griffey hit home run #537, surpassing Mickey Mantle for 12th on the all-time list. He returned on May 11 from a knee injury suffered April 12, and hit a walk-off three-run home run in the bottom of the 11th inning against the Washington Nationals. On June 5, Griffey tied Fred McGriff's record by hitting a home run in his 43rd different ballpark, at the St. Louis Cardinals' Busch Stadium. On June 19, Griffey hit career home run #548 against the Mets, tying him with Mike Schmidt, and then six days later passed Schmidt with #549 against the Cleveland Indians. On June 27, he hit his 550th career home run against the Kansas City Royals. On September 25, 2006, Griffey hit his 27th home run of the season against Chicago Cubs relief pitcher Scott Eyre to tie Reggie Jackson for tenth on the all-time home run list.

Griffey's injuries continued in the 2006 off-season. While on holiday in the Bahamas with his family, he broke his wrist. Griffey said his hand felt fine and he expected to be ready to go for 2007 spring training.

2007

At the beginning of the 2007 Major League Baseball season, Ryan Freel took over center field for the Reds, and Griffey Jr. was moved to right field. Reds manager Jerry Narron said that "I've got to do everything I can do to put our best club out there. My feeling is that with Ryan Freel out there, it gives us strong defense up the middle." Griffey changed his number from 30 to 3 to honor his three children.

On May 10, 2007, Griffey hit his sixth home run of the season and the 569th of his career, tying Rafael Palmeiro for ninth place on the career home runs list. He passed Palmeiro on May 13 against the Los Angeles Dodgers. Griffey tied Harmon Killebrew for eighth on the all-time list hitting his 573rd career home run on May 22. He then surpassed him on May 25 against the Pittsburgh Pirates.

On June 22, 2007, Griffey made his first return to Seattle after his trade to the Reds. Before the game, the Mariners honored him with a 15-minute presentation which included a highlight reel of his playing career with the Mariners, a presentation of a "The House that Griffey Built" memorial by Mariners hall-of-famers and former teammates Jay Buhner and Edgar Martínez, and a four-minute standing ovation from the sold-out crowd. Griffey did not expect such a welcome or a turnout by fans when he came back, and a short but emotional speech was given by Griffey afterwards. Many of the fans in attendance made signs professing their gratitude and adoration toward him with quotes such as: "The House that Griffey Built", "Seattle Junior", and "Griffey we miss you." Griffey went 1-for-5 in the game. On June 24, Griffey hit his 583rd and 584th career home runs, tying and passing Mark McGwire for seventh place on the all-time career home run list.

Following the Cincinnati Reds versus Seattle Mariners series from June 22–24, 2007, a fan movement emerged petitioning Mariners' management to bring Griffey back. Over 1,900 signatures were collected on a fan vid-blog/petition.

Griffey received the most votes of any player in the National League for the 2007 All-Star balloting, and in the July 10 game, he went on to drive in two runs for the National League. On July 16, 2007, Griffey hit his 587th home run to pass Frank Robinson for sixth place on the all-time home run list. On July 18, 2007, Griffey hit his 2,500th hit, a first-inning single off Atlanta Braves starting pitcher John Smoltz.

On September 19, 2007, in a game against the Chicago Cubs, Griffey fielded a Derrek Lee single in right field, then suddenly went down in pain. The injury, first thought to be a lower abdominal strain, was later revealed to be a season-ending groin strain. This marked one of many seasons in Cincinnati in which Griffey had to end the year on the disabled list. Griffey ended the 2007 season with 593 career home runs.

On August 22, 2007, Griffey was selected as an all-time Rawlings Gold Glove winner, on a list of nine players considered the greatest defensive players in the last 50 years. He finished the season with 78 runs, 146 hits, 24 doubles, one triple, 30 home runs, 93 runs batted in, and a .277 batting average in 144 games.

2008
On April 4, 2008, Griffey passed Reggie Jackson for 16th on the all-time list after driving in his 1,702nd run. On June 9, Griffey hit his 600th home run on a 3–1 pitch from Mark Hendrickson of the Florida Marlins in the first inning at Land Shark Stadium in Miami. Fans of both teams gave him a standing ovation.

Despite being ranked second in the National League All-Star voting for outfielders for most of the first half of the season, Griffey finished fourth with 2,907,746 ballots, 87,000 votes behind Kosuke Fukudome. He was not selected to the All-Star Game as a reserve. At the All-Star Break, Griffey was batting .239 with 12 home runs and 42 runs batted in. "I always have a backup plan ... If you can't hit a tough lefty, bunt. If you can't hit a tough righty, bunt. If you can't go to the All-Star Game, go to the Bahamas," Griffey said.

On July 30, Griffey hit his 608th career home run in his last game for the Reds.

Griffey was criticized by some for his effort during his stint with the Reds. Gregg Doyel had this to say of the years Griffey was with the Reds in comparison to the 2010 Reds team. "It's a different Reds team than the older, beer-bellied softball teams of recent years. Those Reds were Ken Griffey and Adam Dunn lounging on the clubhouse's leather couches, hitting home runs, misplaying balls in the outfield and thinking they had it all figured out, when all they knew how to do was lose."

Chicago White Sox (2008)

On July 31, 2008, at the MLB trade deadline, Griffey was traded to the Chicago White Sox in exchange for pitcher Nick Masset and infielder Danny Richar, ending his nine-year tenure in Cincinnati. In his first game with the White Sox, he went 2-for-3 with 2 runs batted in, a walk, and a run.

On August 20, 2008, Griffey hit his first home run as a member of the White Sox, off the Mariners' R. A. Dickey, which moved him into a tie with former outfielder Sammy Sosa for fifth place in career home runs. He surpassed Sosa on September 23, with one off Minnesota's Matt Guerrier.

Griffey's signature moment with the White Sox came on September 30, the last game of the 2008 season; an extra 163rd game between the White Sox and Minnesota Twins to break the tie atop the AL Central. In the fifth inning of the scoreless game, the Twins threatened with Michael Cuddyer on third and one out. Twins third baseman Brendan Harris flied out softly to Griffey in center field, who threw a strike to White Sox catcher A. J. Pierzynski who tagged out Cuddyer at home in a home plate collision to complete the double play and end the threat. The White Sox went on to beat the Twins, 1–0, to advance to the 2008 American League Division Series, where they fell to the Tampa Bay Rays.

On October 30, 2008, the White Sox declined a $16 million option on Griffey, making him a free agent for the first time in his career. Griffey would instead receive a buyout for $4 million, split between the Reds and White Sox. Griffey hit .249 with 18 home runs and 71 runs batted in during 143 games with the Reds and White Sox in 2008. When the 2008 season ended he said he wouldn't retire, saying "I've got things to do."

Return to Mariners (2009–2010)

As a free agent, Griffey was courted by the Mariners and the Atlanta Braves. The national media was dubious about Griffey's ability to contribute meaningfully, with The Washington Post noting "... the Mariners are not about to sign Griffey for baseball reasons; they're bringing him back to Seattle to sell tickets." Griffey ultimately accepted a contract offer from the Mariners on February 18, 2009, after "agonizing" over the decision. Griffey indicated he was motivated by sentimental reasons toward Seattle, where he received an overwhelmingly positive reception when he last played there as a Cincinnati Red in June 2007, but was inclined towards the Braves for its proximity to his home in Orlando, Florida, and his desire to be with his family during the season. Apparently, Griffey was very close to signing with the Braves; however, a premature report emerged from The Atlanta Journal-Constitution that an Atlanta deal was done and a conversation with Willie Mays and his own 13-year-old daughter played a factor in his choice. Griffey once again sported #24 with the Mariners; the team had not issued the number to any player or coach in the nine years between his two stints in Seattle.

Griffey went 1-for-3 with a home run in his regular-season debut on April against the Minnesota Twins. The home run was Griffey's eighth Opening Day home run; as of 2013, he is tied with Frank Robinson and Adam Dunn for first place in this category. On April 15, 2009, Griffey hit his 400th home run as a Mariner (613th of career), off Los Angeles Angels pitcher Jered Weaver, becoming the first MLB player to hit 400 home runs with one club (Mariners) and 200 home runs with another (Reds). AP stated, "Griffey returned to the Mariners in 2009 and almost single-handedly transformed what had been a fractured, bickering clubhouse with his leadership, energy and constant pranks."

On June 23, 2009, at Safeco Field, Griffey hit the 5,000th home run in franchise history, off San Diego Padres pitcher Chad Gaudin. This was Griffey's 619th career home run. On July 1, Griffey hit career home run 621 at the new Yankee Stadium, off Yankees pitcher Andy Pettitte in the sixth inning. It marked the 44th different ballpark in which he had hit a home run. On August 12, 2009, against his former team, the Chicago White Sox, he hit a run-scoring single in the bottom of the 14th inning to win the game, 1–0, for the Mariners.

Griffey returned to the Mariners for the 2010 campaign with a similar one-year contract to that of 2009, but struggled offensively over the first two months while posting a .184 batting average. On April 27, Griffey passed Andre Dawson for 45th on the career hit list. On May 20, 2010, in a game against the Toronto Blue Jays, Griffey hit a run-scoring single off Blue Jays' closer Kevin Gregg to win the game, 4–3, for the Mariners. After starting the ninth inning trailing 3–1, the Mariners rallied in the bottom of the ninth to load the bases on two singles and a walk, then tied the game via a walk and a sacrifice fly. The walk-off single was the final hit and run batted in of Griffey's Major League Baseball career, and moved him past Rafael Palmeiro to 14th on the all-time runs batted in list.

Retirement
In May 2010, Mariners' manager Don Wakamatsu made the decision to significantly limit Griffey's playing due to his ongoing poor performance. On May 10, 2010, beat writer Larry Larue reported that Wakamatsu had not used Griffey in a pinch hitting situation the prior week, with two players stating that Griffey had been asleep. National media quickly covered the incident, dubbed "Napgate". In the ensuing days, teammate Mike Sweeney said he challenged anyone who said Griffey was asleep "to stand up and fight me" with Wakamatsu denying Griffey had been asleep; however, Griffey did not deny it. Griffey's agent stated Larue's initial report had been posted in error and that Larue had asked his employer to remove it, both of which they refuted. In the aftermath of his report, Larue was boycotted by players.

On June 2, 2010, with the clubhouse still in turmoil, Griffey left the Mariners after the second game of a four-game series with the Minnesota Twins, leaving in the middle of the night for a cross-country drive to his home in Florida. He released a statement through the Seattle Mariners organization announcing his retirement effective immediately. Mariners president Chuck Armstrong was only made aware of this by Griffey's agent a few hours before gametime the next day; Griffey then called from the road to confirm it. His retirement was announced at Safeco Field before the Mariners played the Twins. In an interview on March 17, 2011, Griffey stated he had retired to avoid being a distraction for the team.

Post-playing career
On February 17, 2011, Griffey was hired by the Mariners as a special consultant. He is involved with the Mariners at spring training and the regular season, along with visiting most of the Mariners minor-league affiliates.

On January 22, 2013, the Mariners announced Griffey would be the seventh person inducted into the Seattle Mariners Hall of Fame. Griffey joined Alvin Davis (1997), Dave Niehaus (2000), Jay Buhner (2004), Edgar Martínez (2007), Randy Johnson (2012) and Dan Wilson (2012). He was formally inducted on August 10, 2013. Jamie Moyer was selected in 2015.

A campaign had been formed to rename a section of First Avenue South, which runs adjacent to T-Mobile Park, to Ken Griffey Jr. Drive just after his announcement to retire from baseball. Later, the campaign changed direction after the death of Mariners announcer Dave Niehaus in November 2010 to Dave Niehaus Way South.

Writer Bill Simmons pointed out the prevalent belief that Griffey was the best home run hitter of the 1990s who everyone was convinced never used performance enhancing drugs. Therefore, Simmons stated Griffey was the one player who would be the most devastating to "an entire generation of American men" should he ever be linked to steroids.

On August 9, 2014, Griffey was inducted into the Cincinnati Reds Hall of Fame. Griffey returned to Cincinnati for the weekend activities and choked up during his speech when he mentioned wearing the same uniform as his dad.  Second baseman Ron Oester, outfielder Dave Parker, and first baseman Jake Beckley joined Griffey in the Class of 2014.

In 2018, The Seattle Times named Griffey as the most important athlete in Seattle sports history.

On October 25, 2021, Griffey joined the Mariners ownership group, become the first former player to hold partnership interest in the Mariners.

Baseball Hall of Fame election

On January 6, 2016, Griffey was elected to the Baseball Hall of Fame, receiving 99.32 percent of the vote, breaking the record previously held by Tom Seaver's 98.84 percent in 1992. A flag bearing Griffey's number 24 was flown from the Space Needle following the announcement. Griffey is one of three Baseball Hall of Fame inductees who have been chosen first overall in an MLB draft. The other two are Chipper Jones, who was inducted in 2018, and Harold Baines, who was inducted by the Veterans Committee in 2019.

To coincide with his Hall of Fame election, the Mariners announced on January 8, 2016, that they would retire his jersey number 24. The retirement took effect with the start of the 2016 MLB season, with the formal ceremony taking place prior to the Mariners' August 6, 2016 game. The jersey retirement includes the number 24 also being taken out of circulation of all of the Mariners minor league affiliates.

The Mariners also honored Griffey in a unique fashion in the 2016 MLB draft, selecting his son Trey in the 24th round (matching his jersey number), even though Trey, at the time a wide receiver at the University of Arizona, had not played baseball since his preteen years.

On July 29, 2021, Griffey was elected to the Baseball Hall of Fame's Board of Directors.

As of 2021, Griffey is also working as a senior adviser to MLB Commissioner Rob Manfred.

Philanthropy
In 2008, Griffey released a series of charity wines to support The Ken Griffey Jr. Family Foundation, a fund that supports several causes, including the Boys & Girls Clubs of America and several children's hospitals across the United States. He is also an honorary co-chairman of the AOPA Foundation's Hat in the Ring Society, a charitable organization that promotes aviation safety and education.

Film and television

Personal life
In April 2007, Griffey was diagnosed with pleurisy, an inflammation of the lining of the cavity surrounding the lungs which can cause painful respiration and other symptoms.

Griffey and his wife Melissa have three children: Ken Griffey III (Trey), daughter Taryn Kennedy,  son Tevin Kendall. Trey was a wide receiver in the National Football League (NFL) (2017–2019). Taryn attended the University of Arizona and played for the women's basketball team.

The Griffey family resides in Winter Garden, Florida, where Ken Griffey Sr. is also a resident.

Griffey was named an American Public Diplomacy Envoy by Secretary of State Condoleezza Rice on November 18, 2008.

Griffey has a private pilot certificate and owns a Cirrus SR22.

The video game MLB The Show 17'' includes Griffey as the cover athlete for the American version of the game.

The Griffey family joined as a minority owner in the Seattle Sounders FC on November 17, 2020.

Suicide attempt
In January 1988, Griffey attempted suicide by swallowing 277 aspirin pills but wound up in intensive care at Providence Hospital in Mount Airy, Ohio. Griffey Jr. cited arguments with his father, Ken Griffey Sr., depression, and anger as reasons for his attempted suicide. On his failed attempt, Griffey Jr. stated, "It seemed like everyone was yelling at me in baseball, then I came home and everyone was yelling at me there. I got depressed. I got angry. I didn't want to live." He stated that he had also previously contemplated taking his own life, but he had not acted on it until this incident. After Griffey swallowed the aspirin, his girlfriend's mother drove him to the hospital. While in intensive care, he ripped the IV from his arm in order to stop an argument between him and his father. Both Griffey Jr. and his father stated that the incident changed their relationship, and since then, there has been better understanding for both of them.

See also

 50 home run club
 500 home run club
 List of Major League Baseball home run records
 List of Major League Baseball career home run leaders
 List of second-generation Major League Baseball players
 List of Major League Baseball individual streaks
 List of Major League Baseball players who played in four decades
 List of Major League Baseball career hits leaders
 List of members of the Baseball Hall of Fame
 List of Major League Baseball career doubles leaders
 List of Major League Baseball career runs scored leaders
 List of Major League Baseball career runs batted in leaders
 List of Major League Baseball annual runs batted in leaders
 List of Major League Baseball annual home run leaders
 List of Major League Baseball annual runs scored leaders
 List of Major League Baseball career stolen bases leaders
 Major League Baseball titles leaders

References

External links

Ken Griffey Jr. at SABR (Baseball BioProject)

1969 births
Living people
2006 World Baseball Classic players
African-American baseball players
American aviators
American League All-Stars
American League home run champions
American League Most Valuable Player Award winners
American League RBI champions
American philanthropists
Baseball players from Cincinnati
Baseball players from Florida
Baseball players from Pennsylvania
Baseball players from Seattle
Bellingham Mariners players
Chicago White Sox players
Cincinnati Reds players
Gold Glove Award winners
Major League Baseball All-Star Game MVPs
Major League Baseball center fielders
Major League Baseball players with retired numbers
National Baseball Hall of Fame inductees
National League All-Stars
People from Donora, Pennsylvania
People from Issaquah, Washington
People from West Chester, Butler County, Ohio
People from Winter Garden, Florida
San Bernardino Spirit players
Seattle Mariners players
Silver Slugger Award winners
Sportspeople from Orange County, Florida
Sportspeople from the Pittsburgh metropolitan area
Tacoma Rainiers players
Vermont Mariners players
World Baseball Classic players of the United States